Central is an unincorporated community in Angelina County, in the U.S. state of Texas. According to the Handbook of Texas, the community had a population of 200 in 2000. It is located within the Lufkin, Texas micropolitan area.

History
The area in what is now known as Central today was settled sometime before 1900. It had two churches and several businesses in operation in the mid-1930s. Many residents left the community after World War II, but it had a church, a cemetery, three stores, and a population of 105 in the early 1990s. Its population grew to 200 in 2000.

Geography

Education
Central was home to a schoolhouse that served nearby farms in the 1900s, giving it the name Central School. The school was still in operation in the mid-1930s and the early 1990s. Today, the community is served by the Central Independent School District.

References

Unincorporated communities in Angelina County, Texas
Unincorporated communities in Texas